Giovanni Folo (1764–1836) was an Italian engraver of the Neoclassic period, active in Italy.

Folo was born in Bassano del Grappa.  He originally studied with Giulio Golini and Giovanni Battista Mengardi in Venice. In 1781 he moved to Rome to study with Giovanni Volpato, but later he followed the style of Volpato's pupil, Raffaello Morghen, gaining fame for his engravings after famous paintings and sculptures of the most eminent masters, including Raphael, Michelangelo, Titian, Nicolas Poussin, Bertel Thorwaldsen, Antonio Canova and others. He was a member of the Academy of Saint Luke (Accademia di San Luca) in Rome, and died in Rome. In 1836, he was elected into the National Academy of Design as an Honorary Academician.

Gallery

References
Clara Erskine Clement, IA, Painters, sculptors, architects, engravers, and their works, 9th edition, Boston: Houghton and Co., 1892.
M. Bryan and G. Stanley, A biographical and critical dictionary of painters and engravers, from the revival of the arts under Cimabue..., 1816

1764 births
1836 deaths
Italian engravers
People from Bassano del Grappa